A French Chilean is a Chilean citizen of full or partial French ancestry. Between 1840 and 1940, 20,000 to 25,000 French people immigrated to Chile. The country received the fourth largest number of French immigrants to South America after Argentina (239,000), Brazil (150,341) and Uruguay (more than 25,000).

French immigration to Chile 

The French came to Chile in the 18th century, arriving at Concepción as merchants, and in the mid-19th century to cultivate vines in the haciendas of the Central Valley, the homebase of world-famous Chilean wine.  The Araucanía Region also has an important number of people of French ancestry, as the area hosted settlers arrived by the second half of the 19th century as farmers and shopkeepers. With akin Latin culture, the French immigrants quickly assimilated into mainstream Chilean society.

From 1840 to 1940, around 25,000 Frenchmen immigrated to Chile. 80% of them were coming from Southwestern France, especially from Basses-Pyrénées (Basque country and Béarn), Gironde, Charente-Inférieure and Charente and regions situated between Duran, Gers,  and Dordogne.

Most of French immigrants settled in the country between 1875 and 1895. Between October 1882 and December 1897, 8,413 Frenchmen settled in Chile, making up 23% of immigrants (second only after Spaniards) from this period. In 1863, 2,650 French citizens were registered in Chile. At the end of the century they were almost 30,000. According to the census of 1865, out of 83,220 foreigners established in Chile, 6,483 were French, the third largest European community in the country after Germans and Englishmen. In 1875, the community reached 3,000 members, 12% of the almost 85,000 foreigners established in the country. It was estimated that 10,000 Frenchmen were living in Chile in 1912, 7% of the 149,400 Frenchmen living in Latin America.

In World War II, a group of over 10,000 Chileans of French descent joined the Free French Forces and fought the Nazi occupation of France .

Today it is estimated that 800,000 Chileans are of French descent. Former president of Chile, Michelle Bachelet is of French origin. Former dictator Augusto Pinochet is another Chilean of French descent. A large percentage of politicians, businessmen, professionals and entertainers in the country are of French ancestry.

Legacy

French painter Raymond Monvoisin lived in Chile from 1842 to 1854 and founded the Academy of Fine Arts of Santiago. French architect François Brunet de Baines founded the city's first school of architecture.

Prominent French Chileans

 Andrés Allamand, politician and Minister of Defense (2011-2012)
 Alberto Bachelet, Air Force General and father of Michelle Bachelet
 Michelle Bachelet, twice President of Chile and former head of UN Women
 Gonzalo Barroilhet, decathlete.
 Bartolomé Blanche, Army General and provisional President of Chile (1932)
 Vivianne Blanlot, politician and former Minister of Defense (2006-2007)
 María Luisa Bombal Anthes, writer
 Eduardo Bonvallet, former football player and sports commentator
 Jorge Boonen
 Marta Brunet, writer
 César Caillet, actor
 Alfredo Capdeville Soto, actor and cast in famous film Golondrina 1924
 Paul Capdeville, tennis player
 Adolfo Couve
 Cristián de la Fuente Sabarots, actor
 Hugo Droguett, football player
 Alberto Fouilloux, former football player and sports commentator
 Eduardo Fournier
 Alberto Fuguet, writer
 Augusto d'Halmar, writer
 Lucía Hiriart, former First Lady of Chile (1973-1990)
 Francisca Imboden, actress
 Manuel Jacques, politician
 Aline Küppenheim, actress
 Enrique Lafourcade, writer
 Denisse Laval Soza, aka Nicole, singer
 Isabel Le Brun de Pinochet
 Juan Carlos Letelier
 Orlando Letelier
 René Letelier
 Fernando Martel, football player
 Evelyn Matthei Fornet, politician and Minister of Labour (2011–13)
 Josefina Montané, model and actress
 Cecilia Morel, First Lady of Chile (2010–14 and since 2018)
 Alfredo Moreno Charme, businessman and Minister of Foreign Affairs (2010–14)
 Maite Orsini Pascal, model and actress
 Manuel José Ossandón, politician and Senator
 Nicole Perrot, golf player
 Magdalena Petit, writer
 Augusto Pinochet, Army General and military dictator (1973-1990)
 Lucía Pinochet, politician
 Belus Prajoux, tennis player
 Jaime Ravinet, politician
 Manuel Recabarren Rencoret
 Francisco Reyes Morandé, actor
 Álvaro Rudolphy Fontaine, actor
 René Schneider Chereau, Army General
 Juan Subercaseaux
 Luis Subercaseaux
 Anita Tijoux, singer, rapper
 Gabriel Valdés Subercaseaux, politician
 Manuel Camilo Vial
 Roberto Viaux, Army officer
 Ramón Vinay, operatic tenor

See also
 Chile–France relations
 Subercaseaux family

References

External links
 https://web.archive.org/web/20090120174243/http://membres.lycos.fr/emigrationchili/emigracion%20cl.htm  (in Spanish and French)

European Chilean
 
Chile
Chile